Peter Vaughan (1923–2016) was a British character actor.

Peter Vaughan may also refer to:
 Peter Vaughan (bishop) (1930–2020), Bishop of Ramsbury in the Church of England
 Peter Vaughan-Clarke (born 1957), British actor
 Peter Rolfe Vaughan (1935–2008), British academic
 Peter Vaughan (priest) (1770–1825), Dean of Chester, 1820–1826
 Peter Vaughan (police officer) (born 1962), Chief Constable of South Wales Police